Peter Swärdh (born 27 February 1965) is a Swedish football manager and former player.

References

1965 births
Living people
Swedish footballers
Swedish football managers
Mjällby AIF managers
Helsingborgs IF managers
Åtvidabergs FF managers
Kalmar FF managers
Högaborgs BK managers

Association football defenders